This is a list of women writers who were born in Ukraine or whose writings are closely associated with that country.

A
Anastasia Afanasieva (born 1982), physician, poet, writer, translator
Svetlana Alexievich (born 1948), Ukrainian-born Belarusian novelist, journalist, works translated into English
Emma Andijewska (born 1931), poet, short story writer, novelist, some works translated into English
Nadija Hordijenko Andrianova (1921–1998), translator, journalist, writings in Esperanto
Sofia Andrukhovych (born 1982), novelist, translator
Hanna Arsenych-Baran (1970–2021), novelist, poet and prose writer
Rose Ausländer (1901–1988), Ukrainian-born German-language poet

B
Kateryna Babkina (born 1985), poet, writer and playwright.
Anna Bagriana (born 1981), novelist, poet, playwright, translator
Oleksandra Bandura (1917–2010), teacher, literature scholar, writer
Hanna Barvinok, pen name of Oleksandra Kulish-Bilozerska (1828-1911), writer and folklorist.
Marie Bashkirtseff (1858–1884), diarist, painter, sculptor
Natalia Belchenko (born 1973), poet, translator
Nina Bichuya (born 1937), novelist, children's writer
Nella Bielski (1930s–2020), Ukrainian-born French novelist, actress
Natalka Bilotserkivets (born 1954), poet, translator
Inna Bulkina (1963–2021), literary critic and editor

C
Dniprova Chayka, pen name of Liudmyla Vasylevska (1861–1927), poet, short story writer, translator, wrote in Russian and Ukrainian, some works translated into English
Olena Chekan (1946–2013), film, stage and television actress, voice artist, television screenwriter and editor, political journalist and social activist, columnist, short story writer, essayist, humanist and feminist
Daria Chubata (born 1940), Ukrainian physician, writer, poet
Eugenia Chuprina (born 1971) Ukrainian poet, novelist, writer, playwright

D
Anastasia Dmitruk (born 1991), poet, writing in Russian and Ukrainian
Raya Dunayevskaya (1910–1987), Ukrainian-born Russian-American, historical writings on Marxism and feminism, author of Marxism and Freedom: From 1776 Until Today
Ariel Durant (1898–1981), Ukrainian-born Russian-American non-fiction writer, co-author of The Story of Civilization with her husband Will Durant 
Bohdana Durda (born 1940), writer, poet, songwriter
Maryna Dyachenko (born 1968), novelist, short story writer together with her husband Serkiy Dyachenko

G
Zuzanna Ginczanka, pen name of Zuzanna Polina Gincburg (1917-1945), Ukrainian-born Polish-Jewish poet
Lydia Grigorieva (born 1945), poet, photographer, now living in London
Alyona Anatolievna Gromnitskaya (born 1975), poet and political spokesperson
Nataliya Gumenyuk (born 1983) Ukrainian journalist, writer

H
Lyubov Holota (born 1949), novelist, poet, journalist, children's writer
Hrytsko Hryhorenko, pen name of Oleksandra Sudovshchykova-Kosach (1867–1924), poet, short story writer, translator, poetry in Ukrainian, Russian and French
Maryna Hrymych (born 1961), novelist, non-fiction writer, historian, translator
Katrya Hrynevycheva (1875-1947), writer, journalist and community leader
Tamara Hundorova (born 1955), literary critic and culturologist

I
Svetlana Ischenko (born 1969), poet, actress, translator, now living in Canada
Oksana Ivanenko (1906–1997), children's writer and translator

K
Iryna Kalynets (1940–2012), poet, educator, human rights activist
Vera Kamsha (born 1962), Ukrainian-born Russian journalist, fantasy novelist 
Patricia Kilina, pen name of Patricia Nell Warren (1936-2019), novelist, poet, editor and journalist who wrote in English and Ukrainian.
Iya Kiva (born 1984), poet, translator, journalist, critic
Marianna Kiyanovska (born 1973), poet, translator and literary scholar 
Nataliya Kobrynska (1851–1920), short story writer, editor, feminist
Olha Kobylianska (1863–1942), novelist, poet, playwright, feminist
Natalena Koroleva (1888-1966), writer
Sonya Koshkina (born 1985), journalist, editor-in-chief
Lina Kostenko (born 1930), popular poet, children's writer, known for her historical novel in verse
Uliana Kravchenko, pen name of Julia Schneider (1860-1947), writer, educator and poet of German-Ukrainian ancestry
Yevheniia Kucherenko (1922–2020), writer and pedagogue
Olena Kysilevska (1869-1956), social activist, journalist and writer.

L
Salcia Landmann (1911–2002), writings in German in support of the Yiddish language, non-fiction writer
Marina Lewycka (born 1946), British writer of Ukrainian origin, novelist, author of A Short History of Tractors in Ukrainian 
Clarice Lispector (1920–1977), Ukrainian-born Brazilian novelist, journalist, short story writer
Lera Loeb (born c. 1979–1980), Ukrainian born American fashion blogger and publicist
Lada Luzina (born 1972), pseudonym of Vladislava Kucherova, Ukrainian Russian-language author and former journalist

M
Olesya Mamchich (born 1981), poet, children's writer
Maria Matios (born 1959), poet, novelist, some works translated into English
Dzvinka Matiyash (born 1978), writer, poet, children's author and translator
Anastasia Melnichenko (born 1984), journalist
Kateryna Mikhalitsyna (born 1982), poet, children's writer, translator and editor

N
Irène Némirovsky (1903–1942), Ukrainian-born French-language novelist, biographer, author of Suite française

O
Margarita Ormotsadze (born 1981), journalist, poet, novelist, non-fiction writer on economics

P
Atena Pashko (1931–2012), chemical engineer, poet, social activist 
Olena Pchilka (1849–1930), acclaimed poet, publisher, novelist, playwright, feminist
Halyna Petrosanyak (born 1969), poet, writer and translator
Mariyka Pidhiryanka (1881–1963), poet, remembered mainly for her poems for children 
Svitlana Pyrkalo (born 1976), journalist, columnist, novelist, essayist

S
Mariana Savka (born 1973), poet, children's writer, translator and publisher
Iryna Senyk (1926–2009), poet
Iryna Shuvalova (born 1986), poet, translator and scholar
Lyubov Sirota (born 1956), poet, playwright, essayist, author of the Chernobyl Poems
Żanna Słoniowska (born 1978), novelist

T
Olena Teliha (1906–1942), poet, literary activist
Liudmila Titova, Jewish-Ukrainian poet remembered for her 1941 poem on the massacre of Ukrainian Jews
Nika Turbina (1974–2002), Russian-language poet, writing while still a small child, several poems translated into English

U
Lesya Ukrainka, pen name of Larysa Petrivna Kosach-Kvitka (1871–1913), celebrated poet, playwright, essayist, some works translated into English

V
Iryna Vilde, pen name of Dary′na Dmy′trivna Makoho′n (1907–1982), short story writer, novelist
Marko Vovchok, pen name of Mariya Vilinska (1833–1907), prominent short story writer, novelist, translator, wrote in Ukrainian and Russian
Vira Vovk, pen name of Vira Ostapivna Selianska (1926–2022), poet, novelist, playwright, translator, now living in Brazil

Y
Tetiana Yakovenko (born 1954), poet, literary critic, teacher
Lyubov Yanovska (1861–1933), short story writer, playwright, novelist
Yevheniya Yaroshynska (1868–1904), short story writer, translator, wrote in German and Ukrainian

Z
Oksana Zabuzhko (born 1960), poet, novelist, essayist, non-fiction writer
Iryna Zhylenko (1941–2013), poet, essayist, some of her poems translated into English

See also
List of women writers

References

-
Ukrainian
Writers
Writers, women